The Notobranchaeidae, or "naked sea butterflies", are a taxonomic family of floating sea slugs, specifically under the subclass Opistobranchia, also called "sea angels".

Similar to other Pteropods, these pelagic marine heterobranch gastropod mollusks are holoplanktonic.

Morphology
While they are not particularly strong swimmers, the foot of these organisms is modified into wing-like structures, called parapodia that they employ for locomotion. Additionally, like other Pteropods of the order Gymnosomata, Notobrachaeidae lack shells entirely as adults. However, they do possess a shell earlier on in their lives. They are also defined by how they possess a posterior gill, strong jaws, grasping tentacles that frequently possess suckers resembling those of cephalopods, and usually buccal cones as well.

Behavior
Like other members of the clade Gymnosomata, Notobrachaeidae are highly specialized holoplanktonic carnivores. In other words, they spend their entire lives hunting in the water column and cannot swim against the column. Also like other members of this clade, Notobrachaeidae feed are very specific prey, with a species in this clade usually specializing in hunting one specific genus of thecosomes, which are also known as "sea butterflies," and form a sister clade to Gymnosomata with the primary difference being how adults of that clade possess shells into adulthood while Gymnosomata do not.

Distribution
Members of this family are found globally throughout the upper reaches of the water column, in the pelagic zone, most commonly the epipelagic zone.  Following the trend of Pteropods in general, they tend to have the highest species diversity tropical and subtropical latitudes but are less abundant under these conditions. Conversely, they are more abundant but possess less variety in terms of species closer to the north and south poles. However, even in the tropics, they generally appear in high concentrations, resulting in their frequently playing important roles in planktonic food webs.

Genera and species
Genera and species in the family Notobranchaeidae include:

Genus: Notobranchaea Pelseneer, 1886 
 Notobranchaea bleekerae van der Spoel & Pafort-van Iersel, 1985
 Distribution : Oceanic
 Notobranchaea grandis Pruvot-Fol, 1942
 Distribution : Oceanic
 Length : 15 mm
 Notobranchaea hjorti (Bonnevie, 1913)
 Notobranchaea inopinata Pelseneer, 1887
 Distribution : Oceanic
 Length : 5 mm
 Notobranchaea longicollis (Bonnevie, 1913)
 Notobranchaea macdonaldi Pelseneer, 1886
 Distribution : Bermuda, Oceanic
 Length : 5 mm
 Notobranchaea tetrabranchiata Bonnevie, 1913
 Distribution : Oceanic
 Length : 16 mm
 Notobranchaea valdiviae Meisenheimer, 1905
Genera brought into synonymy
 Microdonta Bonnevie, 1913: synonym of Notobranchaea Pelseneer, 1886 (invalid: junior homonym of Microdonta Dejean, 1835 [Coleoptera]; Schleschia is a replacement name)
 Prionoglossa Tesch, 1950: synonym of Notobranchaea Pelseneer, 1886
 Schleschia Strand, 1932: synonym of Notobranchaea Pelseneer, 1886

References 

 Bouchet, P., Rocroi, J.-P. (2005). Classification and nomenclature of gastropod families. Malacologia. 47(1-2): 1-397 .
MolluscaBase (2019). MolluscaBase. Notobranchaeidae Pelseneer, 1886. Accessed through: World Register of Marine Species at: http://www.marinespecies.org/aphia.php?p=taxdetails&id=23080 on 2019-04-16
Gofas, S.; Le Renard, J.; Bouchet, P. (2001). Mollusca. in: Costello, M. J. et al. (eds), European Register of Marine Species: a check-list of the marine species in Europe and a bibliography of guides to their identification. Patrimoines Naturels. 50: 180-213

External links
 
 Bonnevie K. (1913) Pteropoda from the "Michael Sars" North Atlantic Deep-Sea Expedition 1910. Report on the Scientific Results of the "Michael Sars" North Atlantic Deep Sea Expedition 1910 3(1) 1-85, pls. 1-9.

 
Gastropod genera